Colin McDonald (born 10 April 1974) is a Scottish former footballer, who played for Falkirk, Swansea City, Ayr United, Clydebank, Berwick Rangers, Arbroath, Airdrie and Montrose.

Honours
Airdrieonians
Scottish Challenge Cup: 2001–02

References

External links

1974 births
Living people
Footballers from Edinburgh
Scottish footballers
Association football forwards
Hibernian F.C. players
Falkirk F.C. players
Swansea City A.F.C. players
Ayr United F.C. players
Clydebank F.C. (1965) players
Berwick Rangers F.C. players
Arbroath F.C. players
Airdrieonians F.C. (1878) players
Montrose F.C. players
Scottish Football League players
English Football League players
Scotland under-21 international footballers
Gala Fairydean Rovers F.C. players